Saint Jerome is a Christian church father, best known for translating the Bible into Latin.

Saint Jerome may also refer to:

People
 Jerome of Pavia (fl. 778–787), Bishop of Pavia
 Saint Jerome Emiliani (1486–1537), Italian humanitarian, founder of the Somaschi Fathers
 Saint Jerome Hermosilla, one of the Vietnamese Martyrs

Places
 Saint-Jérôme, Quebec, a suburb of Montreal, Canada
 Saint-Jérôme (electoral district)
 Roman Catholic Diocese of Saint-Jérôme
 Saint-Jérôme line, a commuter railway line
 Saint-Jérôme (AMT), a bus and train station
St. Jerome Church (disambiguation), several churches

Arts
 Francesco St Jerome, a c. 1595 oil painting on copper attributed to the circle of Palma the Younger
Saint Jerome (El Greco), a 1609 painting
Saint Jerome in His Study (after van Eyck), a 1442 painting
Saint Jerome Writing, a 1605–1606 oil painting by Italian painter Caravaggio
Saint Jerome Writing (Caravaggio, Valletta), a 1607 or 1608 oil painting
 "Saint Jerome", a song by Jason Schwartzman on the 2009 album Davy

See also
 Boyeux-Saint-Jérôme, a commune in the Ain department, France
 San Geronimo (disambiguation)
 San Jerónimo (disambiguation)

Jerome